Fowlerville is a hamlet and census-designated place (CDP) in the town of York in Livingston County, New York, United States. The population of the CDP was 227 at the 2010 census.

The community is named for Wells Fowler, the first settler.

It should not be confused with other New York hamlets named Fowlerville in Erie County and Sullivan County, or with the similarly named hamlet of Fowlersville in Lewis County

Geography

Demographics

References

Hamlets in New York (state)
Census-designated places in New York (state)
Census-designated places in Livingston County, New York
Hamlets in Livingston County, New York